Events in the year 2019 in Mali.

Incumbents
 President – Ibrahim Boubacar Keïta 
 Prime Minister – Soumeylou Boubèye Maïga

Events 
20 January – Ten Chadian United Nations peacekeepers were killed in an attack by al-Qaeda on the MINUSMA base at Aguelhok. 
April – Scheduled date for the 2019 Malian parliamentary election.
1 November - 2019 Ménaka attack

Deaths
 October 28 – Roman Catholic prelate

References

 
2010s in Mali
Years of the 21st century in Mali
Mali
Mali